Wave Rider was a quarterly surfing magazine of the 1970s.   It was launched in the 1975 by  Gunnar Griffin and John Griffin in Cocoa Beach, Florida.

Staff photographers included Rob Battipaglia, Joaquin Garcia and Larry Marshall and also Sal Catania who was Photo Editor and staff photographer for a short period of time. Reggie Hodgson was the art director in the late-1970s.

Wave Rider covered international surfing as well as surfing on the East Coast of the United States.

Wave Rider ceased publication in 1982.

References

External links
 Wave Rider magazine archive — History and Cover Art

Sports magazines published in the United States
Defunct magazines published in the United States
Magazines established in 1975
Magazines disestablished in 1982
Surfing magazines
Magazines published in Florida
1975 establishments in Florida
1982 disestablishments in Florida